Qudarius Jaquinn Ford (born February 7, 1992) is a professional Canadian football defensive back who is a free agent. He played college football at South Alabama where he was on the team from 2010 to 2015.

Ford signed with the Toronto Argonauts on April 24, 2017, after attending a free agent tryout at IMG Academy. He won his first Grey Cup championship in 2017 where he recorded a team-leading eight defensive tackles in the game. After two seasons where he missed time due to injury, he was released by the Argonauts on February 3, 2020.

Ford signed a two-year contract with the Hamilton Tiger-Cats on February 11, 2020. He was released on June 28, 2021.

References

External links
Toronto Argonauts profile

1992 births
Living people
American football defensive backs
Canadian football defensive backs
African-American players of American football
African-American players of Canadian football
Players of American football from Pensacola, Florida
Players of Canadian football from Pensacola, Florida
South Alabama Jaguars football players
Toronto Argonauts players
Hamilton Tiger-Cats players
21st-century African-American sportspeople